Hydrogen selenide is an inorganic compound with the formula H2Se. This hydrogen chalcogenide is the simplest and most commonly encountered hydride of selenium. H2Se is a colorless, flammable gas under standard conditions. It is the most toxic selenium compound with an exposure limit of 0.05 ppm over an 8-hour period. Even at extremely low concentrations, this compound has a very irritating smell resembling that of decayed horseradish or 'leaking gas', but smells of rotten eggs at higher concentrations.

Structure and properties
H2Se adopts a bent structure with a H−Se−H bond angle of 91°. Consistent with this structure, three IR-active vibrational bands are observed: 2358, 2345, and 1034 cm−1.

The properties of H2S and H2Se are similar, although the selenide is more acidic with pKa = 3.89 and the second pKa = 11, or 15.05 ± 0.02 at 25 °C.

Preparation
Industrially, it is produced by treating elemental selenium at T > 300 °C with hydrogen gas. A number of routes to H2Se have been reported, which are suitable for both large and small scale preparations. In the laboratory, H2Se is usually prepared by the action of water on Al2Se3, concomitant with formation of hydrated alumina. A related reaction involves the acid hydrolysis of FeSe.
Al2Se3  +  6 H2O  ⇌ 2 Al(OH)3  +  3 H2Se
H2Se can also be prepared by means of different methods based on the in situ generation in aqueous solution using boron hydride, Marsh test and Devarda's alloy. According to the Sonoda method, H2Se is generated from the reaction of H2O and CO on Se in the presence of Et3N. H2Se can be purchased in cylinders.

Reactions
Elemental selenium can be recovered from H2Se through a reaction with aqueous sulfur dioxide (SO2).
2 H2Se + SO2 ⇌ 2 H2O + 2 Se + S
Its decomposition is used to prepare the highly pure element.

Applications
H2Se is commonly used in the synthesis of Se-containing compounds. It adds across alkenes. Illustrative is the synthesis of selenoureas from cyanamides:

H2Se gas is used to dope semiconductors with selenium.

Safety
Hydrogen selenide is hazardous, being the most toxic selenium compound and far more toxic than its congener hydrogen sulfide. The threshold limit value is 0.05 ppm. The gas acts as an irritant at concentrations higher than 0.3 ppm, which is the main warning sign of exposure; below 1 ppm, this is "insufficient to prevent exposure", while at 1.5 ppm the irritation is "intolerable". Exposure at high concentrations, even for less than a minute, causes the gas to attack the eyes and mucous membranes; this causes cold-like symptoms for at least a few days afterwards. In Germany, the limit in drinking water is 0.008 mg/L, and the US EPA recommends a maximum contamination of 0.01 mg/L.

Despite being highly toxic, no human fatalities have yet been reported. It is suspected that this is due to the gas' tendency to oxidise to form red selenium in mucous membranes; elemental selenium is less toxic than selenides are.

See also
Hydrogen diselenide

References

External links
 WebElements page on compound's properties
 CDC - NIOSH Pocket Guide to Chemical Hazards

Hydrogen compounds
Triatomic molecules
Selenides